The 2022 Petit Le Mans (known as the 2022 MOTUL Petit Le Mans for sponsorship reasons) was the 25th running of the Petit Le Mans, and was held on October 1, 2022. It was the 12th and final race in the 2022 IMSA SportsCar Championship, and the 4th race of the 2022 Michelin Endurance Cup. The race was held at Road Atlanta in Braselton, Georgia. The event was the last ever race for the DPi Class.

Background
As the final event of the 2022 season, the race marked the swansong for the DPi class. First introduced in 2017, the class enjoyed six seasons of success before making way for the new-for-2023 GTP class. Wayne Taylor, whose team scored the first DPi championship in 2017, described the class as one of the best in North American sports car racing history. Wayne Taylor Racing competed from 2017 to 2020 with the Cadillac DPi-V.R, and from 2021 to 2022 with the Acura ARX-05; the only two manufacturers which took to the grid for the 2022 running of Petit Le Mans. Nissan, who exited following the 2019 season, and Mazda, who pulled their entry after 2021, did not take part. The championship battle in the class was still on, with just 19 points separating the Acura entries from Wayne Taylor Racing and Meyer Shank Racing entering the race weekend.

The Porsche 911 GT3 R and Ferrari 488 GT3 also entered their final IMSA events, ahead of the switch to new-generation GT3 machinery for both manufacturers and their respective customers in 2023. Porsche would introduce a new GT3 offering based on the 992 model, while Ferrari would transition to an entry based on the Ferrari 296.

The event marked the 25th anniversary of the first Petit Le Mans, held in 1998. The winners of the race's inaugural running, Eric van de Poele, Wayne Taylor and Emmanuel Collard, served as grand marshals for the 2022 event.

The race was initially feared to be threatened by Hurricane Ian, with serious concerns expressed early in the preceding week that the storm could threaten the race's running. However, with the changing course of the storm, high winds early in the weekend proved the only major effect on the event's 25th running.

On September 21, 2022, IMSA released the latest technical bulletin outlining Balance of Performance for the event. No changes were made to cars in any of the four classes eligible for BoP adjustments.

The event also preceded an IMSA-sanctioned joint test for the LMDh entries, attended by Acura, BMW, and Cadillac. Of the 2023 LMDh manufacturers, Porsche were the only entrant that did not take part.

Entries

A total of 43 cars took part in the event, split across five classes. 7 were entered in DPi, 6 in LMP2, 8 in LMP3, 7 in GTD Pro, and 15 in GTD.

DPi saw the return of competitors taking part in IMSA's Endurance Cup championship. The Ally Cadillac Racing entry returned in line with its Endurance Cup schedule, while all six full-season DPi teams added a third driver. Scott Dixon returned to Cadillac Racing's #01 entry, while Ryan Hunter-Reay guested in the team's #02 after last appearing at Sebring. Loïc Duval continued in his endurance role for JDC-Miller MotorSports, as did Mike Conway and Hélio Castroneves for Whelen Engineering Racing and Meyer Shank Racing respectively. Toyota factory driver Brendon Hartley joined Wayne Taylor Racing, replacing Will Stevens.

Seven cars were listed on the preliminary LMP2 entry list, but the late withdrawal of the Racing Team Nederland entry following Frits van Eerd's arrest and subsequent release on suspicion of money laundering reduced the final entry list to six. Indy Lights driver Christian Rasmussen joined Era Motorsport for the first time, while other endurance additions included Sebastián Montoya for DragonSpeed, Rui Andrade for Tower Motorsport, Tristan Nunez for the PR1/Mathiasen Motorsports #11 Oreca, and Fabio Scherer at High Class Racing.

LMP3 featured a number of changes from the preliminary entry list. FastMD Racing initially were set to return with Colin Noble, Adam Ali, and Max Hanratty, but were withdrawn late on. The Forty7 Motorsports #7 was also withdrawn, with all three of their scheduled drivers spread across AWA's two entries. Mühlner Motorsport also withdrew their scheduled entry. Other notable additions included Tyler Maxson for Performance Tech Motorsports, and Nico Pino for Sean Creech Motorsport.

GTD Pro included the addition of Risi Competizione's Ferrari 488, as well as WeatherTech Racing's return following Cooper MacNeil's withdrawal from the #79 entry. Nicky Catsburg returned for Corvette Racing, as did Felipe Nasr and Kyle Kirkwood for Pfaff Motorsports and Vasser Sullivan Racing respectively. Jesse Krohn and Tom Gamble joined BMW Team RLL and the Heart of Racing Team, respectively, as well.

15 cars were entered in GTD, decreased by one following the withdrawal of Crucial Motorsports' McLaren 720S GT3. Ulysse de Pauw was drafted into Cetilar Racing's entry with endurance driver Antonio Fuoco taking part in the GT World Challenge Europe season finale in Europe, while Sebastian Priaulx's addition to the Inception Racing McLaren marked the only other brand new addition to a GTD driver roster.

Practice

Practice 1
The first practice session took place at 9:50 AM ET on Thursday and ended with Earl Bamber topping the charts for Cadillac Racing, with a lap time of 1:09.583.

Practice 2
The second practice session took place at 2:55 PM ET on Thursday and ended with Sébastien Bourdais topping the charts for Cadillac Racing, with a lap time of 1:09.040.

Practice 3
The night practice session took place at 7:30 PM ET on Thursday and ended with Earl Bamber again topping the charts for Cadillac Racing, with a lap time of 1:09.880.

Warm-Up
The morning warm-up took place at 9:15 AM ET on Saturday and ended with Loïc Duval topping the charts for JDC-Miller MotorSports, with a lap time of 1:10.406.

Qualifying
Tom Blomqvist took overall pole for Meyer Shank Racing, reducing the championship points gap to 14 points heading into the race.

Qualifying results

Race

Results
Class winners denoted in bold and with

References

External links
2022 Petit Le Mans event schedule at IMSA.com

Petit Le Mans
Petit Le Mans
Petit Le Mans
2022 WeatherTech SportsCar Championship season